Jiaoliping is a railway station on the Forestry Bureau Alishan Forest Railway line located in Zhuqi Township, Chiayi County, Taiwan. It is the midpoint of the railway line.

History
The station was opened on 1 October 1912.

Architecture
Located at an elevation of 997 metres above sea level, the station is a small Japanese-style building with grocery stories from earlier age.

Around the station
 Yuntan Waterfall

See also
 List of railway stations in Taiwan

References

1912 establishments in Taiwan
Alishan Forest Railway stations
Railway stations in Chiayi County
Railway stations opened in 1912